The Deutsche Reichsbahn-Gesellschaft (DRG) Class E 18 is a class of electric locomotives built in Germany and Austria between 1935 and 1955. With exception of Class E 19 it was Deutsche Reichsbahn's fastest electric locomotive. After 1945 most of the surviving locomotives were operated by Deutsche Bundesbahn (DB), although a few passed to Deutsche Reichsbahn (DR) and Österreichische Bundesbahnen (ÖBB).

In addition to the 55 locomotives built in Germany, a further 8 locomotives of a modified design were built in Austria in 1939 as Class E 18.2 (later ÖBB class 1018).

Development 
 dates back to the year 1881, when near Berlin the first public line was taken into service in Berlin. The first mainline electric locomotives were all equipped with large, slow-going single electric motors.

Obviously the large single engines and the resulting power transmission by connecting rods made for poor operation characteristics at high speed. Nevertheless, it was not before 1913 that first electric main line locomotives with nose-suspended, fast-going single motors were commissioned. This development was further delayed by World War I. The decisive breakthrough was finally made in the 1920s, as large numbers of electric trainsets were developed for the electrification of the Berlin Stadtbahn in 1928. Accordingly, also in 1928 the first  electric main line express locomotive entered service.

Class E 17 was a huge success, with a total of 38 units produced. The smaller  was derived for lighter service in the less mountainous middle German regions. However, during the mid-1930s DRG decided to speed up its express train services over the  that Class E 17 was admitted for. The newly developed Class E 18's basic layout was accordingly based on Class E 17. The electric design was based on the newer Class E 04. With respect to the higher speeds new class E 18's shape was streamlined. Another innovation was that the Class E 18 was the first electric locomotive with an engineer's seat. Earlier models were operated standing.

Service

Deutsche Reichsbahn-Gesellschaft 
In 1935 two prototypes were taken into service and tested by DRG. As no major changes were necessary, serial production began shortly afterwards. From the start these powerful locomotives took over most of the express services on electrified lines. Originally intended for service on the Berlin - Munich main line, due to a different layout of the overhead lines in middle Germany (World War II prevented the planned modification). Most locomotives were used in southern Germany. Some also served in Silesia. With regards to the power, top speed and elegant design in 1939 during the Universal Exposition in Paris a Gold Medal was awarded to Class E 18.

Eight locomotives based on the E 18 series were ordered by Bundesbahn Österreich (BBÖ) in 1937 for the electrification of the Salzburg to Linz line. These were built in Austria (by Lokomotivfabrik Floridsdorf) to a modified specification. By 1939 when the units were delivered, Austria was occupied by Germany and the locomotives were delivered to DRG as Class E 18.2 (numbers E 18 201-208).

With 61 units so far delivered, DRG ordered an additional series of another 48 units, but these were not delivered due to the war . During the war seven units were lost to air attacks and two to accidents. The seven units deployed in Silesia were in 1945 transferred to Bavaria in order not to leave them to the advancing Red Army.

Deutsche Bundesbahn 
After the war 34 units passed to the Deutsche Bundesbahn in West Germany, to which were added a further 5 locomotives purchased from East Germany in 1952 and 2 newly built Class E 18s commissioned in 1955. In 1968 Class E 18 was renumbered to DB Class 118. Even though the first production-series Class E 10 locomotives (top speed ) entered service in 1956, it was not until the after the deployment of the new Class 103 TEE production-series locomotives in 1970 that Class 118 was withdrawn from main line express services. They were then used for regional services and charter trains until being retired between 1976 and 1984.

Deutsche Reichsbahn 
Those Class E 18s which were left in Eastern Germany had a rather adventurous history after the war. The five units which were in usable condition were seized by the Soviet Union in 1946 as war reparations. When they were returned in 1952 (in a poor condition), Deutsche Reichsbahn (DR) sold them to West Germany's Deutsche Bundesbahn. This was partly due to the fact that much of East Germany's railway system and most of its electrification equipment had also been transferred to the Soviet Union in the early years of Soviet occupation, thus leaving little work for electric locomotives. However, during the second half of the 1950s DR began to restore electrification to its lines and therefore needed fast electric locomotives. Six damaged E 18 locomotives had been stored at the AEG factory in Hennigsdorf since the war, from which three usable units were re-assembled in 1958-60. One of these locomotives was wrecked in 1969, but the other two were renumbered as DR Class 218 in 1970. The two surviving Class 218 were in service until German reunification, but were taken out of regular service shortly thereafter.

Österreichische Bundesbahnen 
After the war, the newly reformed Austrian Federal Railways (now named Österreichische Bundesbahnen (ÖBB)) renumbered the seven remaining usable Class E 18.2 to ÖBB Class 1018 (1018.01-05, 07 and 08).  In addition to these, one working locomotive (1018.101) was assembled from the parts of war-damaged E 18 046 and E 18 206. The ÖBB also inherited the German E 18 42, which became the solitary ÖBB Class 1118 (1118.01). These two mavericks retained German gear transmission ratios, and were ÖBB's fastest locomotives until Class 1042.5 was commissioned in the late 1960s.

The ÖBB locomotives received some modernisations (e. g. new cabfront windows, with two windows instead of the original three), and the last examples remained in service until the early 1990s.

Preserved 
Of the 55 Class E 18 locomotives built, six have been preserved. No. E 18 03 is in the DB Museum Koblenz. E 18 08 is owned by the Garmisch Stiftung Bahn-Sozialwerk and is stored at Augsburg Railway Park. E 18 19 is privately owned and is kept in the former Bahnbetriebswerk at Glachau. The town of Gemünden am Main is seeking to turn E 18 24 into a worthy monument with its long tradition as a railway hub, but at present it is being restored in Weimar by the TEV Thüringer Eisenbahn. E 18 31 (formerly in the DR fleet) belongs to the Dresden Transport Museum and is stored in shed P. No. E 18 47 is owned by the Nuremberg Transport Museum.

Notes

References

Sources

External links 

 Reminiscences about the Class E 18, in German
  More pictures of Class 118

Electric locomotives of Austria
Electric locomotives of Germany
15 kV AC locomotives
1′Do1′ locomotives
E 18
Krupp locomotives
AEG locomotives
Railway locomotives introduced in 1935
Standard gauge locomotives of Austria
Standard gauge locomotives of Germany